The 2004 Cupa României was the 1st annual Romanian women's football knockout tournaments.

Semifinals

Final 
CFF Clujana Performante

References

Rom
Fem
Rom
Women's sport in Romania